Brian Prior (13 September 1938 – 27 November 2011) was  a former Australian rules footballer who played with Footscray in the Victorian Football League (VFL).

Notes

External links 
		

1938 births
2011 deaths
Australian rules footballers from Victoria (Australia)
Western Bulldogs players
Braybrook Football Club players